Western Province is a province of Sri Lanka, containing the Colombo District, Gampaha District, and Kalutara District. The following is a list of settlements in the province.



A
Aboyne, Adikarigoda, Adikarimulla, Adikkandiya, Adupe, Agalawatta, Agalegedara, Ahugammana, Akaragama, Akarangaha, Akarawita, Akarawita, Akkaragoda, Akureliya, Akurukalawita, Akurumulla, Alakandupitiya, Alavi, Alawala, Alawatupitiya, Alubomulla, Alubowila, Alugolla, Alutepola, Alutgama Bogamuwa, Alutgama Bogomuwa, Alutgama East, Alutgama West, Alutgamwidiya, Alutgangoda, Aluthgama, Aluthgamwidiya, Aluthkade, Alutkade Tunmanhandiya, Alutkadetenmanhandiya, Alwis Town, Amandoluwa, Ambagahawatta, Ambagaspitiya, Ambalammulla, Ambalanduwa, Ambalangoda, Ambalanmulla, Ambalayaya, Ambana, Ambanwita, Ambatale, Ambegoda, Ambepitiya, Ambepussa, Ambepussa Government Farm, Ambulgama, Ampitigala, Amunugoda, Amunukumbura, Andiambalam Walpola, Andiambalama, Andigoda, Andimalla, Andimulla, Andiya, Andupe, Angampitiya, Angangoda, Anganpitiya, Angoda, Angomuwa, Angulana, Anguruwatota, Anuragoda, Arakagoda, Arakawila, Aramangoda, Arambe, Arambegodella, Aramonagolla, Arangala, Arapangama, Arukgoda, Arukpassa, Arukwatta, Arupassa, Asgeriya, Asgiriwalpola, Asgiriya, Assenawatta, Assennawatta, Atale, Atgalgoda, Athagama, Athgalgoda, Athgangoda, Atigala, Attanagalla, Attidiya, Atulugama, Atupatdeniya, Atupotdeniya, Atupothdeniya, Atura, Ature, Athurugiriya, Atweltota, Avariwatta, Avissawella, Awariwatta

B
Badahalagoda, Badalgama, Badalgoda, Badanagoda, Badugama, Badureliya, Baduwatugoda, Bajjangoda, Balabowa, Balagalla, Battaramulla, Beruwala

C
Catharine's, Cinnamon Gardens, Colombo, Colpetty

D
Dadagamuwa, Dagona, Dahenpahuwa, Dalugama, Dalugangoda, Dalupatgedara, Dalupotha, Daluwekotuwa, Dambadurai, Dambadure, Dharga Town, Dehiwala

E
Egaloya, Egoda Uyana, Egodawatta, Egodawatta, Ekala, Ekalakurunduwatta, Ekela, Eladuva, Eladuwa, Eladuwa, Elamalawala, Elamalewala, Elapiliyawa, Elapitawala, Elapitiwela, Elapitiyala, Eliwila, Ellakkala, Ellalamulla, Ellangala, Elluvapitiya, Elston, Eluwapitiya, Embaraluwa, Enderamulla, Epambula, Epamulla, Erabadda, Erabedda, Erepolagodella, Erewwala, Essella, Eswatta, Etgala, Etikehelgalla, Ettukal, Ettukala, Etulkotte, Evariwatta, Ewariwatta

F
Fort (Colombo)

G
Galagedara, Galahitiyawa, Galboda, Galborella, Galedanda, Galewatta, Galgamuwa, Galgomuwa, Galhena, Galhetiya
Grand Pass

H
Habarakada, Haddagoda, Hakgalla, Hakkurukumbura, Hakurukumbura, Hakwadunna, Halanduruwa, Halapitiya, Halawegoda, Halgampitiya, Hanwella, Hokandara, Horana, Homagama

I
Iddagoda, Ihala Hewessa, Ihala Imbulgoda, Ihala Karannagoda, Ihala Naragala, Ihala Neboda, Ihala Wadugoda, Ihala Welgama, Ihalapanangala, Ihalayagoda, Ingiriya

J
Ja-Ela, Jaligoda, Jaltara, Jambugaswadiya, Jambureliya, Jawatta, Josnell

K
Kirindiwela, Kadawatha, Kalutara, Kumbuka, Kahatapitiya, Kiribathgoda, Kottawa, Kaduwela, Kaubedda, Kandana
Kotahena

L
Labugama, Ladduwa, Langana, Lansiyawatta, Lathpandura, Latpandura, Laulupitiya, Lenagala, Lenewara, Leuwanduwa

M
Mabima, Mabima, Mabodale, Mabogoda, Mabole, Mabula, Mabulgoda, Madabaddara, Madabawita, Madakada, Maggona, Maharagama, Malabe, Mathugama, Mount Lavinia

N
Nittambuwa, Nugegoda

O
Obberiya, Ogodapola, Okanduwa, Olabaduwa, Olaboduwa, Omatta, Opalla, Opata, Opatha, Opathella

P
Panadura,
Padukka

Q
None

R
Radamulla, Radawadunna, Radawana, Raddalgoda, Raddegoda, Raddoluwa, Ragama, Rajagiriya, Rambukkana, Ramminike, Ratmalana

S
Samanabedda, Samanabedde, Sambagama, Sangarama, Sapugaskanda, Sapugaskande, Sarikamulla, Sarikkamulla, Sayakkaramulla, Sedawatta

T
Tabuwana, Talagala, Talagama, Talahena, Talahena, Talahera, Talahitiya, Talangama, Talangama North, Talangama South

U
Uda Kanugala, Udagama, Udagama, Udaganella, Udahamulla, Udahamulupattiya, Udakamanpella, Udakamanpelle, Udakananpella, Udamapitigama

V
Vavulagallana, Veyangoda, Vitanamulla

W
Waddegoda, Wadduwa, Wadugama, Wadugoda, Wadumulla, Wadumulla, Wadurawa, Waduruwa, Waga

X
None

Y
Yakkala, Yatiyanthota

Z
None

See also
 List of cities in Sri Lanka
 List of towns in Sri Lanka

References

 
Western Province
Western Province